Château Marsyas is a vineyard located in the Beqaa Valley in Lebanon. The name of the property stems from the ancient Greek name of the Bekaa valley known as the Marsyas valley in Hellenistic times.
The estate's surface area is around 600,000 sqm, situated in the village of Kefraya and Tell Dnoub.
The family also owns and operates a Syrian estate known as Domaine de Bargylus.

History

The Saadé family, of Orthodox Christian origins, is originally from the coastal city of Latakia, known in ancient times as Laodicea ad Mare (i.e. "Laodicea-by-the-sea"). The Saadé family traces its mercantile roots to the 18th and 19th century with prominent representatives such as Gabriel Saadé (1854-1939) and Rodolphe Saadé (1900-1956). With an initial involvement in commodities’ trading and various industries, the family developed maritime and land transport activities on the initiative of Johnny Saadé, Rodolphe’s son, in Syria, Lebanon, Jordan, Iraq, and France. 
Johnny Saadé shifted his activities to the wine making, tourism and real estate fields.

The winery was established in 2007 at which date it produced its first vintage. It works closely with international consultant Stéphane Derenoncourt. The Saadé family also owns Domaine de Bargylus in Syria.

Grape varieties

Red wines are made with a blend of Cabernet Sauvignon, Syrah and Merlot. A blend of Chardonnay and Sauvignon Blanc is used for the white wine.
The middle-range red B-Qa de Marsyas is made of Cabernet Sauvignon, Syrah and Mourvedre.

References

External links
Au Liban, les raisins de l'espoirLe Monde
La viticulture au Liban, un développement salué et reconnuLe Figaro
Château Marsyas 2009, LibanSud-Ouest
When Size doesn't matterExecutive Magazine
Sandro Saadé, co-founder of Bekaa Valley's Château Marsyas and Syria’s Domaine de BargylusHarpers.co.uk
Lebanese-Syrian Brothers Look WestNew York Times
Chateau Marsyas releases new wineHospitality News Middle-east
Marsyas lance un deuxième vinLe Commerce du Levant
Viticulture/ Le vin du terroir prend une nouvelle dimensionL'Orient-le Jour

Wineries of Lebanon